Anthony Saunders is the John M. Schiff Professor of Finance at New York University Stern School of Business and is currently on the Executive Committee of the Salomon Center of the Study of Financial Institutions.  He teaches "Market and Liquidity Risk" in the Risk Management Open Enrollment program for Stern Executive Education .  Saunders also teaches for both the Master of Science in Global Finance (MSGF) and Master of Science in Risk Management Program for Executives (MSRM).  MSGF is jointly offered by NYU Stern and the Hong Kong University of Science and Technology. MSRM  is offered by NYU Stern, in partnership with the Amsterdam Institute of Finance.

Saunders has taught both undergraduate and graduate level courses at NYU since 1978, and his teaching and research have specialized in financial institutions and international banking.  He has also served as a visiting professor all over the world, including at INSEAD, the Stockholm School of Economics, and the University of Melbourne.

Biography
Saunders holds positions on the Board of Academic Consultants of the Federal Reserve Board of Governors as well as on the Council of Research Advisors for the Federal National Mortgage Association.  In addition, he has acted as a visiting scholar at the comptroller of the Currency and at the Federal Monetary Fund.

Publications
Saunders is an editor of the Journal of Banking and Finance and the Journal of Financial Markets, Instruments and Institutions, and is an associate editor of eight other journals, including Financial Management and the Journal of Money, Credit and Banking.  He has written two books and over 70 books, and his research has been published in all of the major finance and banking journals and in several books.

 (9th ed. 2017, ISBN 978-1259717772)

Education
Saunders received his BS, MS, and PhD from the London School of Economics.

References

External links
Stern Executive Education 
NYU Stern Profile
Anthony Saunders’ Biography
List of Books on Amazon
Master of Science in Global Finance

New York University Stern School of Business faculty
Alumni of the London School of Economics
Year of birth missing (living people)
Living people
Academic staff of the Stockholm School of Economics